The US Open women's singles championship is an annual tennis event that is being held since 1887 as part of the US Open tournament. The tournament is played on outdoor hard courts at the USTA Billie Jean King National Tennis Center in Flushing Meadows – Corona Park, New York City.

The US Open is played during a two-week period in late August and early September and has been chronologically the last of the four Grand Slam tournaments of the tennis year since 1987. The Philadelphia Cricket Club (1887–1920) and Forest Hills (1921–1977) hosted the event before it settled in 1978 at its current site.  The United States Tennis Association is the national body that organizes this event.

The champion receives a full-size replica of the event's trophy engraved with her name. In 2022, the winner received prize money of US$2,600,000.

History
The format of the women's singles event has undergone several changes since the first edition. From 1888 through 1918, the event started with a knockout phase, the All-Comers singles, whose winner faced the defending champion in a challenge round. The All-Comers winner was awarded the title by default six times (1893, 1899, 1900, 1905, 1906 and 1907) in the absence of the previous year's champion. The challenge round system was abolished with the 1919 edition. Since 1887, all matches have been played as the best-of-three sets, except in the eleven-year period from 1891 until 1901, when the challenge round was scored the best-of-five-sets. From 1894 until 1901 the women were required to play best-of-five sets in both the all-comers final and the challenge round.

Format
Since 1887, the winner of the next game at five-games–all took the set in every match except the All-Comers final and the challenge round, which was won by the player who had won at least six games and at least two games more than his opponent. This advantage format was introduced for the final sets of early rounds, for women starting in 1887, and used for all sets in final rounds from 1887 through 1969. The tie-break system was introduced in 1970 for all sets, in its best-of-nine points sudden death version until 1974, and in its best-of-12 points lingering death version since 1975. The US Open is the only Grand Slam tournament to have a third set tie-break, which has occurred twice in women's singles finals in 1981 and in 1985.

Surface
The court surface changed twice, from grass (1887–1974), to Har-Tru clay (1975–1977), to hard courts since 1978. No women's tennis player won the event on all three surfaces, and no women's tennis player won it on both grass and clay. Chris Evert was the only one to win the event on clay and on hard court, thereby making her the only woman to win on two different surfaces at the event.

Finals
Key

U.S. National Championships

US Open

Statistics

In the U.S. National Championships, under the challenge round format, Elisabeth Moore (1896, 1901, 1903, 1905) holds the record for most singles titles with four and Hazel Hotchkiss Wightman (1909–1911) holds the record for most consecutive women's singles titles at three. With four consecutive singles titles each, Molla Bjurstedt Mallory (1915–1918) and Helen Jacobs (1932–1935) hold the record for most consecutive women's singles titles won after the challenge round format was abolished. Bjurstedt Mallory's eight singles titles (1915–1918, 1920–1922, 1926) is the all-time record.

During the US Open, since the inclusion of the professional tennis players, Chris Evert (1975–1978) holds the record for most consecutive women's singles titles at four and the record for most overall titles at six (1975–1978, 1980, 1982) with Serena Williams (1999, 2002, 2008, 2012–2014).

This event has been won without losing a set during the open era by Margaret Court in 1969, Billie Jean King in 1971 and 1972, Evert in 1976, 1977 and 1978, Martina Navratilova in 1983 and 1987, Monica Seles in 1992, Steffi Graf in 1996, Martina Hingis in 1997, Lindsay Davenport in 1998, Venus Williams in 2001, Serena Williams in 2002, 2008 and 2014, Justine Henin in 2007 and Emma Raducanu in 2021.

Multiple champions

Champions by country

See also

US Open other competitions
List of US Open men's singles champions
List of US Open men's doubles champions 
List of US Open women's doubles champions
List of US Open mixed doubles champions

Grand Slam women's singles
List of Australian Open women's singles champions 
List of French Open women's singles champions
List of Wimbledon ladies' singles champions
 List of Grand Slam women's singles champions

Notes

References
General

Specific

External links
US Open official website

Women
US Open
Women's tennis in the United States